The Erer is a perennial river of eastern Ethiopia.

See also 
 Rivers of Ethiopia

References

Shebelle River
Rivers of Ethiopia